Sigmund Mjelve (6 April 1926 – 26 November 1995) was a Norwegian writer. He was awarded Gyldendal's Endowment in 1990, and the Brage Prize in 1994 for Område aldri fastlagt.

Awards 
Gyldendal's Endowment 1990
Brage Prize 1994

References

1926 births
1995 deaths
20th-century Norwegian writers